Mafiosa, full title Mafiosa, le clan is a French crime drama television series, which premiered on Canal+ on December 6, 2006. The series was created by Hugues Pagan.

The popular series extended for four more seasons added for 2008, 2010, 2012 and 2014. The 2014 series was renamed Mafiosa - L'ultime saison (Mafiosa - the last season). Each season of the series comprised 8 episodes for a total of 40 episodes.

The producer for the series was Nicole Collet with Serge Moati as assistant producer. Various directors for the seasons included Louis Choquette (season 1), Éric Rochant (seasons 2 and 3), Pierre Leccia (seasons 4 and 5).

Plot
By the will of her murdered uncle, the Corsican mafia boss François Paoli, the clan's lawyer, Sandra Paoli (Hélène Fillières), suddenly finds herself the head of the clan. Backed up by her brother, Jean-Michel Paoli, she learns how to assert herself in a very violent world and becomes a respected, but also hated, woman in a world of men, murder and criminality.

According to several media sources, the character Sandra is an adaptation of the current life of the Corsican widow Sandra Casanova-Germani whose brother Jean-Luc Germani is the most wanted man in France. The series contains violence and political schemes.

Main characters

Season 1 (2006-2007)
Director : Louis Choquette
Producer : Nicole Collet
Assistant producer : Serge Moati
Screenwriter : Stéphanie Benson 
Music composer :  Cyril Morin
Episodes broadcast:
1 and 2: 12 December 2006
3 and 4: 19 December 2006
5 and 6: 26 December 2006
7 and 8: 2 January 2007
Main characters : 
Hélène Fillières : Sandra Paoli
Thierry Neuvic : Jean-Michel Paoli
Other recurring characters
 Phareelle Onoyan : Carmen Paoli
 Fabrizio Rongione : Rémi Andréani
 Pierre-Marie Mosconi : Mattei
 Caroline Baehr : Marie-Luce Paoli
 Guy Cimino : Hyacinthe Leandri Paoli
 Erick Desmarestz : Président Larcher
 Patrick Dell'Isola : Commissaire Rocca
 Marisa Berenson : Caterina Paoli
 Daniel Duval : François Paoli
 Claude Faraldo : Ange-Marie Paoli
 Jo Fondacci : Simon Bianchini
 Yves Jacques : Mathieu Zamponi
 Rémi Martin : Martial Santoni
 Venantino Venantini : Charly «La machine» Scaglia
 Didier Landucci : Dominique Bianchini
 Isabelle Tanakil : Maria Léandri
 Catriona MacColl : DEA correspondent
 Cédric Appietto : Gino Poletti
 Marie-Ange Geronimi : amie de Ange-Marie Paoli

Season 2 (2008)
Director : Éric Rochant
Producer : Nicole Collet
Assistant producer : Serge Moati
Screenwriters : Pierre Leccia and Éric Rochant
Music composer : Marco Prince
Episodes broadcast:
1 and 2: 17 November 2008
3 and 4: 24 November 2008
5 and 6: 1 December 2008
7 and 8: 8 December 2008
Main characters : 
Hélène Fillières : Sandra Paoli
Thierry Neuvic : Jean-Michel Paoli
Éric Fraticelli : Antoine "Tony" Campana
Frédéric Graziani : Joseph Emmanuel Frédéric "Manu" Mordiconi
Other recurring characters
 Phareelle Onoyan : Carmen Paoli
 Jean-Pierre Kalfon : Toussaint Scaglia
 Caroline Baehr : Marie-Luce Paoli
 Fabrizio Rongione : Rémi Andréani
 Guy Cimino : Hyacinthe Leandri
 Jean-François Stévenin : Coco Casanova
 Didier Landucci (new role) : Pierre-Mathieu (Coco's handman)
 Antoine Basler : Commissaire Rocca
 Marc Bodnar : Commissaire Keller
 Jonathan Cohen : Patrick Benmussa
 JoeyStarr : Moktar
 Pierre-Laurent Santelli : «Le Dentiste»
 Marie-Ange Geronimi : Ange-Marie Paoli's friend
 Michel Ferracci : Ortoli
 Alice Pol : Aurélie

Season 3 (2010)
Director : Éric Rochant
Producer : Nicole Collet
Assistant producer : Serge Moati
Screenwriters : Pierre Leccia and Éric Rochant
Music composer: Pierre Gambini
Music superviser : Pascal Mayer
Episodes broadcast:
1 and 2: 22 November 2010
3 and 4: 29 November 2010
5 and 6: 6 December 2010
7 and 8: 13 December 2010
Main characters : 
Hélène Fillières : Sandra Paoli
Thierry Neuvic : Jean-Michel Paoli
Éric Fraticelli : Antoine "Tony" Campana
Frédéric Graziani : Joseph Emmanuel Frédéric "Manu" Mordiconi
Other recurring characters
 Phareelle Onoyan : Carmen Paoli
 JoeyStarr : Moktar
 Lionel Tavera : Poli
 Reda Kateb : Nader
 Michel Ferracci (new role) :  André Luciani
 Daniel Delorme : The mayor
 Pierre Leccia : Pierre-Mathieu Grimaldi
 Jean-François Perrone : Jean Santini
 Helena Noguerra : Laetitia Tavera
 Abraham Belaga : Mikael Giacomini
 Véronique Volta : Saudade Canarelli
 Jean-Philippe Ricci : Commissaire Alain Damiani
 Denis Braccini : Commissaire Thomas Quilichini
 Julia Pierrini-Darcourt : Tony's lover
 Benjamin Garcia Casinelli : Tony's lover's husband

Season 4 (2012)
Director : Pierre Leccia
Producer : Nicole Collet
Assistant producer : Serge Moati
Music composer: Pierre Gambini
Music superviser : Pascal Mayer
Episodes broadcast:
1 and 2: 19 March 2012
3 and 4: 26 March 2012
5 and 6: 2 April 2012
7 and 8: 9 April 2012
Main characters : 
Hélène Fillières : Sandra Paoli
Éric Fraticelli : Antoine "Tony" Campana
Frédéric Graziani : Joseph Emmanuel Frédéric "Manu" Mordiconi
Other recurring characters
 Phareelle Onoyan : Carmen Paoli
 Jean-Pierre Kalfon : Toussaint Scaglia
 Lionel Tavera : Poli
 Jean-François Perrone : Jean Santini
 Philippe Nahon : Jules Acquaviva
 Jérôme Robart : Sebastien Acquaviva
 Renan Carteaux : Son of game house owner
 Stefano Accorsi : Enzo Manfredi
 Abraham Belaga : Mikael Giacomini
 Véronique Volta : Saudade Canarelli
 Linda Hardy : Livia Tavera
 Jean-Philippe Ricci : Commissioner Alain Damiani
 Denis Braccini : Commissioner Thomas Quilichini
 Anna Mihalcea : Milka
 Pierrick Tonelli : PJ officer
 Michel Ferracci : André Luciani
 Cédric Appietto (new role) : Guy Bastiani
 Paul Prudenti : Simon Comiti
 Antò Mela : Ludo Campana
 Marie Murcia : Marie-Paule Campana
 Emmanuelle Hauck : Christelle Paoli
 Paul Garatte : Jean-Luc Feruti

Season 5 - Mafiosa - L'ultime saison (2014)

Director : Pierre Leccia
Episodes broadcast:
1 and 2: 14 April 2014
3 and 4: 21 April 2014
5 and 6: 28 April 2014
7 and 8: 5 May 2014
Main characters : 
Hélène Fillières : Sandra Paoli
Éric Fraticelli : Antoine "Tony" Campana
Philippe Corticchiato : Joseph Emmanuel Frédéric "Manu" Mordiconi
Recurring characters
 Phareelle Onoyan : Carmen Paoli
Bruno Magne : Daniel Colombani

References

External links
Official website on Canal+ website
 

2006 French television series debuts
French-language television shows
2000s French drama television series
2010s French drama television series
French crime drama television series
Television series about organized crime
Films set in Corsica
Canal+ original programming
Works about organized crime in France
Corsican mafia